Kyzyltu may refer to:
Kyzyltu, Kazakhstan, a village in the Almaty Province, Kazakhstan
Kyzyl-Tuu, several villages in Kyrgyzstan
Kyzyltu, Russia, a rural locality (a settlement) in Altai Krai, Russia